Lorenzo Guerrero Gutiérrez (13 November 1900 – 15 April 1981) was a Nicaraguan politician and a close associate of Somoza family. Guerrero was the president of the upper chamber of National Congress of Nicaragua 1949–1950, 1953–1954, 1956-1957 and 1962. Guerrero served as one of the Vice Presidents in the administration of René Schick from May 1963 to August 1966 and became President of Nicaragua on 4 August 1966 following the death of Schick. Guerrero served the remainder of Schick's term and handed over the presidency to Anastasio Somoza Debayle on 1 May 1967, who in turn appointed Guerrero as his Foreign Minister. He was a relative of his predecessor René Schick.

References

Rulers.org – Foreign ministers L–R

1900 births
1981 deaths
People from Granada, Nicaragua
Presidents of Nicaragua
Vice presidents of Nicaragua
Presidents of the Senate (Nicaragua)
Foreign Ministers of Nicaragua
Nationalist Liberal Party politicians
People of the Nicaraguan Revolution